Ziaz Mahalleh (also Romanized as Zīāz Maḩalleh; also known as Zīār Maḩalleh) is a village in Reza Mahalleh Rural District, in the Central District of Rudsar County, Gilan Province, Iran. At the 2006 census, its population was 31, in 12 families.

References 

Populated places in Rudsar County